"Hans in Luck" is a fairy tale of Germanic origin, recorded by the Brothers Grimm.  It is Aarne-Thompson type 1415.

Plot summary
Hans has been working hard for seven years but wishes to return to see his poor mother. His master pays him his wages which amounts to a lump of gold the size of his head. Hans puts the gold in a handkerchief and starts out on his journey jogging but soon becomes tired. He spots a rider on horseback and seeing the ease at which the horse travels he offers to exchange his lump of gold for the horse. Happy with the exchange, the man gives him the horse and Hans rides off.

The horse bolts and Hans gets bucked off, whereupon he meets a shepherd who convinces Hans to trade his horse for a cow. Telling Hans that a cow can provide milk, cheese and butter and is of more leisurely company. Hans takes up on the offer and continues his journey only to find that the cow is dry and not producing any milk as he had been told.

Disgruntled with the cow, Hans meets a butcher who gives him a pig for the cow. Thanking the butcher for the pig Hans sets off jogging again, hopeful he has now found an ideal travel companion. Alas, Hans meets a countryman who informs him that the pig's owner is the squire and he is in danger of being arrested for taking the squire's pig. Hans takes the countryman's goose in exchange for his pig, happy that it will provide a good roast and a supply of goose fat.

At his next stop in a village Hans meets a scissor-grinder and explains his story to him. The scissor-grinder offers him a grindstone for his goose arguing that a grindstone will provide a source of income. Hans happily exchanges the goose for the grindstone. He continues on his way, but is tired carrying the grindstone and is short of money for food.

Hans stops for a drink on the banks of a river, the grindstone falls into the deep water and is lost. Hans is happy to be rid of the heavy grindstone and being free of all troubles. He walks on to his mother's house and recounts his lucky tale.

Origin
"Hans in Luck" is a German folk tale recorded by the Brothers Grimm and published in Grimm's Fairy Tales 1812.

Adaptations
The story has been adapted for an animation film called Hans in Luck (1978)

It has also been adapted for the stage by American composer Omari Tau in the one-act opera Hans In Luck (2011)

Analysis
Hans in Luck has been described as an ironic fairy tale which inverts the normal "rags to riches" story format. Instead, it can be interpreted as anti-materialistic as Hans trades in his newly won treasures and expresses relief to be freed from the weight to return home happily. It can also be set apart from many other folk and fairy tales as it avoids romantic themes such as damsels and princesses; instead focusing upon maternal love as Hans is returning home to see his mother.

Motifs
The English fairy tale The Hedley Kow contains a similar sequence in which the main character persuades herself that every change is proof of her good luck.

Notes

External links

Grimms' Fairy Tales
ATU 1350-1439